John Michael Gibbons (born June 8, 1962) is an American former professional baseball player and former manager of the Toronto Blue Jays of Major League Baseball (MLB). Gibbons briefly played in the Major Leagues as a catcher with the New York Mets, in the mid-1980s.

Early life
Gibbons was born in Great Falls, Montana, and raised in San Antonio, Texas, where he attended Douglas MacArthur High School. The son of United States Air Force colonel William Gibbons, he had his first Little League Baseball at-bat while playing in Happy Valley-Goose Bay, Labrador, Canada, where the family lived temporarily.

Playing career
Gibbons was selected by the New York Mets with the 24th overall pick of the 1980 amateur draft. He spent the next three years moving up through the Mets minor-league system. In 1984, he was considered to be the Mets' top catching prospect, and was set to start the season in the majors. However, a collision with the Phillies' Joe Lefebvre in late March landed him on the 15-day disabled list. He eventually started six games at catcher in April 1984, but batted only .040 in that stretch. He went back on the disabled list with a sore arm at the end of April, and was sent back to AAA Tidewater after that.

Gibbons was next called up to the majors in the 1986 Mets season. He appeared in 8 games and batted .474 (9 for 19), but the Mets already had the majors' best catcher in Gary Carter and an established backup in Ed Hearn. Gibbons served as the Mets' bullpen catcher during the 1986 postseason, and earned a World Series ring when the Mets won the World Series.

Gibbons spent the next four seasons on five different AAA teams. He retired as a player after the 1990 season.

Coaching and managerial career

Minor leagues
Gibbons began his coaching career with the Mets in 1990 as a minor league roving catching instructor. In 1994, he joined the Mets' South Atlantic League franchise, the Capital City Bombers, as a hitting coach.

Gibbons began his minor-league managing career in the Mets' organization with the Kingsport Mets, guiding them to the Appalachian League championship in 1995. He followed that by guiding the St. Lucie Mets to the Florida State League title the next season. In 1998, he led the Eastern League's Binghamton Mets to the playoffs, and then followed that with three seasons as manager of the Norfolk Tides. He led the Tides to the International League playoffs in 2001.

Toronto Blue Jays (2002–2008)

Hired by the Toronto Blue Jays' former general manager J. P. Ricciardi in 2002, as a bullpen catcher, Gibbons worked his way up to first base coach in June 2002. Ricciardi was his former roommate in the minor leagues.

After Ricciardi fired manager Carlos Tosca in 2004, Gibbons was promoted to the manager position. The Blue Jays went 20–30 with Gibbons at the helm.

At the end of the 2004 regular season, Gibbons signed a one-year contract as the manager for the 2005 season. He was later given a two-year contract extension just a week into the 2005 season. Gibbons went on to lead the Jays to an 80–82 record in his first full season as a big league manager.

Expectations were higher in 2006, after the Blue Jays acquired A. J. Burnett, Troy Glaus, Lyle Overbay, B. J. Ryan, and Bengie Molina. Toronto ended the season in second place in the American League East division with an 87–75 record, one game ahead of the Boston Red Sox. Although they finished 10 games out of first, it was the first time the Jays had finished higher than third since 1993, when they won their second of two consecutive World Series titles.

With the Blue Jays mired in a slump that put them five games below .500, Gibbons was fired on June 20, 2008. He was replaced by former Jays manager Cito Gaston. He finished with a record of 305 wins and 305 losses.

Kansas City Royals and San Antonio Missions (2009–2012)
On October 10, 2008, Gibbons was hired as the bench coach by the Kansas City Royals, replacing Dave Owen, who became the third base coach.

Gibbons was hired at the end of the 2011 season to manage the San Diego Padres' Double-A affiliate, the San Antonio Missions.

Second stint with Toronto (2013–2018)

On November 20, 2012, it was announced that Gibbons was re-hired as manager of the Toronto Blue Jays on a two–year rolling contract. Gibbons was named to the 2013 American League All-Star coaching staff by Detroit Tigers manager Jim Leyland. The Blue Jays finished the 2013 season with a 74–88 record, putting them last in the AL East.

The Blue Jays were six games up in the AL East title race on June 6, 2014, but posted a 45–54 record from that point on, including a 9–17 record in August. They would finish the season with a record of 83–79, good enough for third place in the AL East, and five games back of a wild card spot.

On June 22, 2015, the Blue Jays defeated the Tampa Bay Rays 8–5 for Gibbons' 500th managerial win. On August 2, Gibbons was ejected for the third time in the 2015 season, for arguing with umpire Jim Wolf. Gibbons returned to the field later in the game during a bench-clearing incident, and was subsequently suspended for one game. On September 25, Gibbons and the Blue Jays ended the team's 22-year playoff drought by clinching a playoff berth. Five days later, the Blue Jays defeated the Baltimore Orioles 15–2, and clinched the American League East. On October 14, 2015, the Blue Jays defeated the Texas Rangers to win the American League Division Series after losing the first two games of the series. The Blue Jays moved on to play in their first American League Championship Series since 1993. They were defeated by the eventual World Series champions, the Kansas City Royals, in six games.

On April 5, 2016, after a 3–2 loss to the Tampa Bay Rays ended on a questionable slide by José Bautista which was ruled as a double play, Gibbons stated, "Maybe we'll come out and wear dresses tomorrow. Maybe that's what everybody's looking for." A day later, after he received criticism for his initial comment, he said that "the world needs to lighten up a little bit". On May 17, Gibbons was suspended three games by Major League Baseball for his role in a benches-clearing incident between the Blue Jays and Texas Rangers on May 15 involving Rangers infielder Rougned Odor and Blue Jays outfielder José Bautista. On September 11, Gibbons was ejected for the eighth time in the 2016 season, tying the team's single-season record set by Bobby Cox; he led the major leagues in 2016. In 2016, he was successful on a lower percentage of replay challenges than any other MLB manager with 10 or more challenges, at 38.8%. The Blue Jays made the playoffs for the second consecutive season, and defeated Baltimore in the Wild Card Game to advance. In the Division Series, the Blue Jays swept the Texas Rangers in three games. Toronto was eliminated by the Cleveland Indians in the Championship Series, four games to one.

On April 1, 2017, Gibbons signed a two-year extension with the Blue Jays, that also included an option for the 2020 season. In 2017, he was again successful on a lower percentage of replay challenges than any other MLB manager with 10 or more challenges, at 26.7%.

On September 26, 2018, it was confirmed by the Blue Jays that Gibbons would not return for the 2019 season.  Toronto mayor John Tory proclaimed the 26th as "John Gibbons Day" in Toronto, noting Gibbons' "tremendous contributions to the Toronto Blue Jays franchise." His final game was a 9–4 loss to the Tampa Bay Rays. The Blue Jays finished the 2018 season with a 73–89 record. In 2018 he was ejected seven times, more than any other manager in the major leagues. During his second stint as Blue Jays manager, he finished with a record of 488 wins and 484 losses. Overall, Gibbons has a 793–789 record from both stints as Blue Jays manager.

Managerial record

Controversy with players
On May 28, 2005, Gibbons chastised former Toronto starter Dave Bush in the dugout after the right-hander showed his displeasure on the mound about being removed from a game. The next day, Bush was sent to the minor leagues and after the season, he was traded to the Milwaukee Brewers.
Gibbons was again involved in controversy in July 2006, after his feud with Shea Hillenbrand came to a head. After the Blue Jays infielder and designated hitter wrote negative comments about the team on a display board in the Blue Jays clubhouse, Gibbons confronted him in a closed team meeting and challenged him to a fight. Hillenbrand declined to fight. Hillenbrand was upset about his lack of playing time and that no one in the Blue Jays front office had made an attempt to congratulate him on recently adopting a child. Three days later the Blue Jays traded Hillenbrand, who was hitting .301 at the time, to the San Francisco Giants.  In 2012, after Gibbons was re-hired as the Blue Jays manager, Hillenbrand endorsed the hiring and acknowledged that he, not Gibbons, was at fault for the controversy, saying "I think he handled the situation that we had very professionally and I didn't handle it professionally at all. I think John's going to be a great addition to that ball club and he's a great guy."
On August 21, 2006, Gibbons walked to the mound in the third inning to remove pitcher Ted Lilly from Toronto's game against the Oakland Athletics. Visibly frustrated at his own performance (having given up seven runs in that inning to erase an 8–0 lead), Lilly initially refused to surrender the ball to Gibbons. Words were exchanged and Lilly left the mound and headed for the clubhouse. When Gibbons returned to the dugout, he followed Lilly into the clubhouse tunnel where, according to eyewitnesses, he confronted his pitcher regarding his insubordination. Cameramen saw Gibbons push Lilly first. "Gibbons just went at him," photographer Aaron Harris said. The two exchanged shoves, and a number of players and Blue Jays staff rushed in from the dugout to break it up. During MLB's 2014 winter meetings, Lilly was working as a front-office member of the Chicago Cubs. Signalling that he harbored no hard feelings, Gibbons stuck his head into a Chicago hotel suite filled with media and laughingly called Lilly out.
At the beginning of the 2008 season, Gibbons benched future Hall-of-Famer Frank Thomas, who had a batting average of .167 after the first 20 games of the season. Thomas, typically a slow starter, was livid over his lack of playing time. He claimed that the Blue Jays were giving him less playing time to prevent him from getting 364 at-bats in the season, which was the required amount for his $10 million 2009 option to become guaranteed. The Blue Jays responded the next day on April 20, 2008, by releasing Thomas. Blue Jays general manager J.P. Ricciardi met with Thomas and they agreed that the best thing for the team and for Thomas would be to let him go.  Thomas returned to the Oakland Athletics and hit well  despite some struggle with injury.  It was his last season in the Major Leagues.
After striking out for the second time in three innings in a game against the New York Yankees on August 16, 2016, Blue Jays third baseman and reigning American League MVP Josh Donaldson returned to the dugout and angrily threw his bat against a bat-rack very close to where Gibbons was standing. Gibbons quickly confronted Donaldson, and the pair got into a short argument in an incident that was caught on camera. Blue Jays' players Troy Tulowitzki and Josh Thole stepped in to restrain Donaldson. The incident, while creating "fabulous talk-show fodder", was ultimately quickly forgotten. Said Gibbons after the game, "I told him after the first at-bat, get a new bat, that one ain't working. He took the same one up the second time. That didn't work. He chose to break it. So I went down and told him, you should have listened to me. That was basically it."  Donaldson downplayed the altercation as well, saying that Gibbons simply wanted a better smell of a new cologne Donaldson was wearing.

Notes

External links

Toronto Blue Jays page
John Gibbons addressing a school assembly with a motivational speech

1962 births
Douglas MacArthur High School (San Antonio) alumni
Albuquerque Dukes players
American expatriate baseball people in Canada
Baseball players from Montana
Baseball players from San Antonio
Jackson Mets players
Kansas City Royals coaches
Kingsport Mets players
Living people
Major League Baseball bench coaches
Major League Baseball bullpen catchers
Major League Baseball catchers
New York Mets players
Norfolk Tides managers
Oklahoma City 89ers players
Sportspeople from Great Falls, Montana
Scranton/Wilkes-Barre Red Barons players
Shelby Mets players
Tidewater Tides players
Toronto Blue Jays managers
Binghamton Mets managers
San Antonio Missions managers
Baseball coaches from Montana
Anchorage Glacier Pilots players